The Berislavić family of Trogir was a Croatian noble family whose origin is unknown. They are likely to have been kin to the Berislavići Vrhrički. Petar Berislavić (1475–1520), the Ban of Croatia, was a member of the family.

See also
Berislavić family of Vrh Rike, Croatian noble family from Vrlika

References

Berislavić noble family
Medieval Croatian nobility
People from Trogir